Gaya Merbah (born 22 July 1994) is an Algerian footballer who plays as a goalkeeper for IR Tanger on loan from Raja CA.

Career
In 2019, Gaya signed a contract with  CR Belouizdad.
In 2022, Gaya signed a three-and-a-half-year contract with Raja CA.

Honours 
CR Belouizdad

Algerian Ligue Professionnelle 1: 2019–20, 2020–21

Individuale 
 Raja CA Player of the Month: March 2022

References

External links

NFT Profile

1994 births
Living people
Association football goalkeepers
Algerian footballers
Algeria international footballers
Raja CA players
RC Arbaâ players
NA Hussein Dey players
Footballers from Tizi Ouzou
RC Kouba players
21st-century Algerian people